Windlesham Arboretum is between the villages of Windlesham and Lightwater in Surrey, United Kingdom. The arboretum features lakes, monuments, follies, a small chapel and approximately 22,000 mature and rare trees. The Windle Brook runs through the arboretum and has seven main footbridges and approximately ten ponds on each side, some of which are more properly identifiable as lakes based on size.

Features
The arboretum, which is also a fresh water park, is located in the south of the civil parish of Windlesham, where alluvial soils juxtapose, furthest from the brook, with acidic, naturally wet, heath.

A small percentage of land use is for homes, one of which is a farm, within the bounds, which own small parts of the arboretum as their semi-woodland garden in the style of Gertrude Jekyll, who lived in Surrey for most of her life.  One such home is that of Major William Spowers, who founded the Arboretum, and died there in 2009.

Ownership and rules
The arboretum is owned by a charitable trust. The objects of the charitable trust are to advance education in the study of trees and birds and access to the arboretum is restricted to educational activities. The public is permitted limited access from four main entry points, spread around the compass, during daylight hours.  Picnics, barbecues, cycling and leisure activities other than walking, study and reflection are prohibited. It is patrolled most days, and maintained to ensure its use remains in accordance with the trust's objectives.

Archaeology
An archeological survey of the Arboretum was carried out by the Surrey Heath Archaeological & Heritage Trust and found coins and pottery and signs of old Iron Age enclosure ditches and Romano-British agricultural buildings.

References

External links
 Satellite image of Windlesham Arboretum

Arboreta in England
Protected areas of Surrey
Parks and open spaces in Surrey
Woodland gardens